Mitchell Loewen (born February 14, 1993) is a former American football tight end. He played college football at Arkansas. He signed as an undrafted free agent with the New Orleans Saints in 2016.

High school
Loewen attended Lahainaluna High School in Lahaina, Hawai'i. He is son of former NFL offensive lineman Chuck Loewen, who played for the San Diego Chargers from 1980 to 1984.

Professional career

New Orleans Saints
Loewen signed with the New Orleans Saints as an undrafted free agent on May 2, 2016. He was placed on the reserve/non-football injury list on June 6, 2016, prematurely ending his rookie season.

In Week 2 against the Patriots, Loewen suffered a high-ankle sprain and was placed on injured reserve on September 20, 2017.

On December 27, 2018, Loewen was waived by the Saints.

Detroit Lions
On December 28, 2018, Loewen was claimed off waivers by the Detroit Lions. He was released during final roster cuts on August 30, 2019.

New Orleans Saints (second stint)
On September 1, 2019, Loewen was signed to the New Orleans Saints practice squad. He was promoted to the active roster on September 9, 2019. He was waived on September 10 and re-signed to the practice squad. He signed a reserve/future contract with the Saints on January 7, 2020.

When Loewen changed positions from defensive end to tight end during the 2019 season, he switched his jersey number to 88.

On May 15, 2020, the Saints waived Loewen.

References

External links
Arkansas Razorbacks bio

1993 births
Living people
Arkansas Razorbacks football players
Detroit Lions players
New Orleans Saints players
People from Lahaina, Hawaii
Players of American football from Hawaii